The 2021 Total 6 Hours of Spa-Francorchamps was an endurance sports car racing event held at the Circuit de Spa-Francorchamps, Stavelot, Belgium on 1 May 2021. It served as the opening round of the 2021 FIA World Endurance Championship, and was the tenth running of the event as part of the championship. The race marked the debut of the new 'Hypercar' era of endurance racing and was won by the debuting #8 Toyota GR010 Hybrid.

Qualifying

Qualifying results
Pole position winners in each class are marked in bold.

Race

Race Result
The minimum number of laps for classification (70% of the overall winning car's race distance) was 113 laps.

Standings after the race

2021 Hypercar World Endurance Drivers' Championship

2021 Hypercar World Endurance Championship

 Note: Only the top five positions are included for the Drivers Championship standings.

2021 World Endurance GTE Drivers' Championship

2021 World Endurance GTE Manufacturers' Championship

 Note: Only the top five positions are included for the Drivers Championship standings.

References

6 Hours of Spa-Francorchamps
Auto races in Belgium
Circuit de Spa-Francorchamps
Spa-Francorchamps
6 Hours of Spa-Francorchamps
6 Hours of Spa-Francorchamps